Kalenderi is a village in the municipality of Kostajnica, Republika Srpska, Bosnia and Herzegovina.

References

Villages in Republika Srpska